Ömer Toprak (born 21 July 1989) is a Turkish professional footballer who plays as a centre back for Süper Lig club Antalyaspor. He formerly played for the Turkey national team.

Club career
Toprak began his career with TSB Ravensburg in 1994. In 2001, he moved to FV Ravensburg.

SC Freiburg
Toprak signed for SC Freiburg in 2005. Three years later, He signed his first professional contract in the 2007–08 season. During that period, he played for Freiburg U19 and the reserve team and won 22 games with the latter.

In his first professional season, he featured in 26 league games and scored 4 goals as Freiburg won the 2. Bundesliga and promoted after a defeat of VfL Osnabrück. On 9 June 2009, Toprak suffered from a karting accident, causing him to miss the first half of the 2009–10 season but he recovered, scoring a goal against Hamburger SV on the 65th minute. Toprak played 24 league games during the 2010–11 season.

Bayer Leverkusen
Bayer 04 Leverkusen signed Toprak as a replacement for newly retired Sami Hyypiä for a reported transfer fee of €2 to 3 million. He appeared in the match versus Dynamo Dresden in the 2011–12 DFB-Pokal but they were eliminated 4–3. In Bayer's first match against Mainz 05, he scored an own goal, causing his team to lose 2–0. He scored another own goal against Hertha BSC. Bayer managed to qualify to the Champions League round of 16, where they were eliminated by FC Barcelona.

In January 2014, Toprak agreed a contract extension until 2018.

Werder Bremen
In August 2019, Toprak joined Werder Bremen on a year-long loan from Borussia Dortmund. Werder Bremen announced the deal includes an purchase obligation to permanently sign Toprak that would come into effect with a "high likelihood"; the reported transfer fee agreed for that case was reported as €5 to 6 million.
The permanent signing took effect in July 2020.

Antalyaspor
On 30 June 2022, Toprak signed a two-year contract with Antalyaspor.

International career

He was included in the Germany U19 that won the 2008 UEFA European Under-19 Championship. He appeared in three matches during the tournament, scoring one goal.

On 30 September 2011, Toprak was named to the Turkey national team by coach Guus Hiddink for the upcoming UEFA Euro 2012 qualifying matches against Germany and Azerbaijan. He made his Turkish debut on 15 November against Croatia in the second leg of UEFA Euro 2012 qualifying play-offs, playing the full 90 minutes of a goalless draw at the Stadion Maksimir in Zagreb which ensured that Croatia advanced to the finals 3–0 on aggregate.

Personal life
Toprak is the son of Turkish immigrants from Sivas. He was born and raised in Ravensburg, Baden-Württemberg. He has one older sister and two older brothers one of whom, Harun, is also a professional football player for FV Ravensburg. His cousin, Rahman Soyudoğru, has also played professional football, including in Germany and Turkey.

On 9 June 2009, Toprak was involved in a karting accident, in which he suffered severe burns and had to be treated in a special clinic. He was able to resume training after only four months.

Career statistics

Club

International

Honours
SC Freiburg
 2. Bundesliga: 2008–09

Borussia Dortmund
 DFL-Supercup: 2019

Germany U19
UEFA European Under-19 Championship:2008

References

External links
 
 
 
 

1989 births
Living people
People from Ravensburg
Sportspeople from Tübingen (region)
Citizens of Turkey through descent
German people of Turkish descent
Turkish footballers
German footballers
Footballers from Baden-Württemberg
Association football central defenders
Turkey international footballers
Germany youth international footballers
Bundesliga players
2. Bundesliga players
FV Ravensburg players
SC Freiburg players
Bayer 04 Leverkusen players
Borussia Dortmund players
SV Werder Bremen players
Antalyaspor footballers